Thierry François Pelenga alias Bokassa is an Anti-balaka leader from Haute-Kotto prefecture in the Central African Republic and a war criminal.

War 
As a member of Banda ethnic group Pelenga was leader of one of Banda self-defense groups in Bria under influence of FPRC. In June 2016 he was elected zone commanders of Bria's subprefecture. Maxime Mokom reportedly approached him and tried to persuade him to join Anti-balaka. Initially he refused.

In February 2018 he was reportedly one of leaders of Anti-balaka in PK3 camp in Bria, Central African Republic, together with Jean-Francis Diandi alias Ramazani. At this point he was 35 years old. In June 2018 he killed four women in the village of Gbre five km from Bria. Day later his fighters killed three people.

In December 2020 he left Bria to join Coalition of Patriots for Change in Bambari. Later he returned with his fighters to Bria-Igrabanda road. Several cases of sexual violence have been reported since his arrival. In July 2021 he was reportedly based in Igrabanda south of Bria. On 31 July he agreed to disarm 50 of his fighters. Government forces collected 31 weapons.

References 

Living people
Year of birth missing (living people)
Leaders of Anti-balaka